Embiotoca jacksoni, commonly known as the black surfperch, is a species of surfperches native to shallow coastal areas of the eastern Pacific. Other common names of the species include black perch and butterlips. They are usually a dark reddish brown to tan in color, often also with vertical dark bars across their body. They are commercially important food and game fish.

Taxonomy
Embiotoca jacksoni is one of two species classified under the genus Embiotoca, the other being the striped surfperch (Embiotoca lateralis). They belong to the surfperch family Embiotocidae. The species was first described by the Swiss-American biologist Louis Agassiz in 1853.

Description
The body of black surfperches is flattened laterally. Despite their common name, they are not black in color. They are usually a uniform dark reddish brown to tan in color, but they often also possess large darker colored vertical bars across their body (unlike striped surfperches which have horizontal orange and blue stripes). Rarely, they may exhibit a paler silvery to greenish-white body coloration with fainter bars, thus resembling barred surfperches (Amphistichus argenteus). Black surfperches can still be distinguished, however, by the presence of a patch of enlarged scales between the pectoral and the pelvic fins.

The thick lips are yellowish in color and may exhibit a darker "mustache" above the upper lip. The tail and pelvic fins are usually orange to reddish, occasionally possessing gold and dark blue stripes. They are believed to be capable of changing color for camouflage.

Biology and ecology
During mating season (summer), the males develop a pair of nipple-like organs extending from their anal fins. Like all surfperches, they are viviparous (giving birth to live young). They reach sexual maturity after one or two years (at the length of ) and can live for up to nine years.

They are carnivores, feeding primarily on small invertebrates during the day. Prey animals consist mostly of gammarid amphipods and other crustaceans, but they also prey on worms, bryozoans, and mollusks. Smaller black surfperches can behave as cleaner fish, consuming ectoparasites from each other and from other fish species.

Distribution and habitat
Black surfperches are native to the eastern Pacific. They can be found from shallow coastal waters from Fort Bragg, California to Punta Abreojos, Baja California Sur, including off Guadalupe Island. They inhabit rocky areas, eelgrass beds, and kelp forests, but can occasionally be found in sandy areas near human structures like piers or pilings.

Name
The specific name honours A.C Jackson who carried out a survey of port locations in San Francisco where he drew a sketch of a gravid female which he sent to Agassiz.

Importance
They are commercially important food and game fish. They are usually caught by baited hooks and spearfishing.

References

Black surfperch
Taxa named by Louis Agassiz
Fish described in 1853